PRRS can refer to:

 Porcine reproductive and respiratory syndrome, a disease of pigs
 Radical Socialist Republican Party, a former Spanish political party

See also
 PRR (disambiguation)